KYKK (93.5 FM) is a country music radio station licensed to Junction, Texas, United States. The station is currently owned by Tenn-Vol Corp.

History
The station was assigned the call letters KAHO on April 7, 1994. On September 8, 1998, the station changed its call sign to KOOK. On June 12, 2007, the station was sold to Foster Charitable Foundation.

On June 18, 2018, the station changed its call sign to KYKK. Effective September 7, 2018, the station was sold to Tenn-Vol Corp.

References

External links

YKK (FM)
Radio stations established in 1997
1997 establishments in Texas
Country radio stations in the United States